Brood may refer to:

Nature
 Brood, a collective term for offspring
 Brooding, the incubation of bird eggs by their parents
 Bee brood, the young of a beehive
 Individual broods of North American Periodical Cicadas:
 Brood X, the largest brood, which emerges on a 17-year cycle
 Brood XIII, a brood centered on Northern Illinois and its surrounding area, which also emerges on a 17-year cycle
 Brood XIX, a large brood in the Southern United States which emerges on a 13-year cycle

Research search has led to this discovery but should give source so as not to commit plagiarism.

People with the surname
 Herman Brood (1946–2001), Dutch musician, painter, actor, poet and media personality
 Philippe Brood (1964–2000), Dutch politician

Entertainment
 The Brood, a 1979 horror film directed by David Cronenberg
 Brood (comics), an alien species from the Marvel Comics universe
 The Brood (professional wrestling), and The New Brood, WWF professional wrestling stables in 1999
 "The Brood", an episode of the television series of Exosquad
 Brood, the dragon clan in Breath of Fire III

Music
 The Brood (band), a crossover thrash band from Venice, California
 The Brood (album), a 1984 album by Herman Brood
 Brood (album), 1994 album by Melbourne band My Friend the Chocolate Cake
 Broods (duo), a New Zealand pop music duo
 Elliott Brood, a death country band from Toronto

See also 
 Brod (disambiguation)

Dutch-language surnames